The 2002 South American Rugby Championship "B" was the third edition of the competition of the second level national Rugby Union teams in South America.

The tournament was played in Lima, with four team participating.

Brasil won the tournament.

Standings 
 Three point for victory, two for draw, and one for lost 
{| class="wikitable"
|-
!width=165|Team
!width=40|Played
!width=40|Won
!width=40|Drawn
!width=40|Lost
!width=40|For
!width=40|Against
!width=40|Difference
!width=40|Pts
|- bgcolor=#ccffcc align=center
|align=left| 
|3||3||0||0||126||22||+ 104||9
|- align=center
|align=left| 
|3||2||0||1||58||40||+ 18||7
|- align=center
|align=left| 
|3||1||0||2||41||57||- 16||5
|- align=center
|align=left| 
|3||0||0||3||3||109||- 106||3
|}

Results 
 
 First Round

 Second Round

 Third round

References

2002
B
rugby union
rugby union
rugby union
rugby union
International rugby union competitions hosted by Peru
2002 rugby union tournaments for national teams